Vera Khlyzova (born 2001) is a Russian Paralympic cross-country skier and biathlete. She competes in the B2 category, which is for visually impaired athletes. She won the World Cup in para cross-country skiing 2019/20. She has Natalia Iakimova as her guide. She won the Paralympic cross-country skiing World Cup in 2019–20. Her sight guide is Natalia Iakimova.

Career 
In the 2019–20 season, Khlyzova won the World Cup in para cross-country skiing, and she also won the World Cup in para biathlon in that season. The following season, she came in third place in the World Cup in para cross-country skiing, and won the World Cup in para biathlon.

Khlyzova won the gold medal in the women's 6km, 10km and 12.5km biathlon events at the 2021 World Para Snow Sports Championships held in Lillehammer, Norway. She also won the silver and bronze medal in the women's 15km and 10km cross-country skiing events respectively.

References 

2001 births
Living people
Russian female biathletes
Russian female cross-country skiers
Visually impaired category Paralympic competitors
Place of birth missing (living people)
21st-century Russian women
Russian blind people